Portrait of Stéphane Mallarmé is an 1876 oil on canvas portrait by Édouard Manet of the poet Stéphane Mallarmé, a friend of Manet's. It is now in the Musée d'Orsay in Paris, which originally had acquired it from the subject himself.

References

Mallarme
1876 paintings
Paintings in the collection of the Musée d'Orsay
Mallarme